Fornos may refer to the following places in Portugal:

 Fornos (Castelo de Paiva), a civil parish in the municipality of Castelo de Paiva
 Fornos (Freixo de Espada à Cinta), a civil parish in the municipality of Freixo de Espada à Cinta 
 Fornos (Marco de Canaveses), a civil parish in the municipality of Marco de Canaveses
 Fornos (Santa Maria da Feira), a civil parish in the municipality of Santa Maria da Feira 
 Fornos de Algodres, a municipality in the district of Guarda
 Fornos de Algodres (parish), a civil parish in the municipality of Fornos de Algodres
 Fornos de Maceira Dão, a civil parish in the municipality of Mangualde
 Fornos do Pinhal, a civil parish in the municipality of Valpaços